Jack Carty is an Australian musician and songwriter from Bellingen, New South Wales. He currently resides in Brisbane.

Though none of his releases to date have achieved a high level of commercial success, they have received critical acclaim in his home country of Australia from national press including: The Australian, The Weekend Australian and The Sydney Morning Herald, and Arts and Entertainment websites including: The Music, TheAUReview, Timber & Steel, FasterLouder, Beat, and Music Feeds.

Carty has toured in Australia, the United States and Canada, appearing at festivals such as: South By South West (SXSW), Canadian Music Week (CMW), Woodford Folk Festival, Queenscliff Music Festival (QMF), and Mullum Music Festival. Carty has supported artists including: Josh Pyke, Justin Townes Earle, Matt Corby, Katie Noonan, Robert Ellis, Ingrid Michaelson and Joshua Radin. Carty completed his own headline tours (the most recent being in August/September/October 2013 launching "The Predictable Crisis of Modern Life" E.P.

Albums and EPs
Carty has released 5 albums and 2 EP's
Albums:
2011:  One Thousand Origami Birds  
2012:  Break Your Own Heart  
2014: Esk  
2016: Home State  
2018: "Hospital Hill" the strings album was released as a collaborative project with musician Gus Gardiner.

E.P's: 
2010 "Wine & Consequence" 
2013 "The Predictable Crisis of Modern Life") through Sydney based independent record label "Gigpiglet Recordings" distributed in Australia and New Zealand through Inertia Music Pty Ltd.

Honors and awards
In 2010 Carty won "Acoustic Singer-Songwriter of the Year" at the National MusicOZ Awards.

References

1987 births
Australian singer-songwriters
People from New South Wales
Living people
21st-century Australian singers